Pessat-Villeneuve is a commune in the Puy-de-Dôme department near [Riom] in Auvergne in central France.

See also
Communes of the Puy-de-Dôme department

References

Pessatvilleneuve